Freebola, also known as Chica Light, is a pop rock song by Chilean rock band Glup! featured in their debut album 1999. The name of the song is a portmanteau of the word free and frivolous. The song became an instant hit in Chile and, due to it fast tempo, has persisted as a classic in Chilean discothèques.

References
Rock chileno en la decada de los noventa: sistematizacion estilistica y funcionamiento de mercado - Diego Portales University
Koko Stambuk Apunta alto - El Mercurio online, 2009.

1999 songs
1999 singles
Glup! songs
1999 in Chile
Songs written by Koko Stambuk